Craig John Fairbrass (born 15 January 1964) is an English actor, producer, and screenwriter. He is best known for his roles as Delmar in the thriller film Cliffhanger (1993), Dan Sullivan in the BBC soap opera EastEnders (1999–2001), Pat Tate in the Rise of the Footsoldier film series (2007–present), and the original voice of Simon "Ghost" Riley in the Call of Duty video game series (2007–present).

Early life
Craig John Fairbrass was born at Mile End Hospital in London on 15 January 1964, the son of seamstress Maureen and dock worker Jack Fairbrass. He grew up in Stepney and has a younger sister named Lindsey. After being expelled from Eaglesfield Boys Comprehensive School in Woolwich at the age of 15, he successfully auditioned for the National Youth Theatre. He then began searching for a talent agent to represent him, supporting himself financially for the next five years by working as a roofer in the daytime and working evenings as a doorman at what he would later call some of the "less desirable nightspots" in southeast London. From these jobs, he saved enough money to buy a small sandwich shop at Woolwich Market, which he then used as his primary source of income until he began to secure acting roles more steadily.

Career
After a few years of walk-on roles in Emmerdale, Three Up Two Down, and Shelley, Fairbrass made his first real TV appearance as an actor in the 1984 BBC television series Big Deal as Nev in the episode "Fighting chance" followed by another BBC role in Tucker's Luck. He made his feature film acting debut as D.I Challoner in the 1989 Working title thriller For Queen and Country opposite Academy Award winner Denzel Washington. Film and television appearances quickly followed, including the Ray Winstone film Tank Malling, and the Channel 4 Film, The Final Frame playing Suggs's right-hand man, Franklin. He also landed a regular role as Gary 'Technique' Pagnall in the ITV drama series London's Burning in 1990. That same year Fairbrass was cast opposite Helen Mirren as Detective Inspector Frank Burkin in the Bafta/Emmy Award-winning original Prime Suspect 1 and 2.

In 1991, he travelled to Los Angeles and secured his first Hollywood acting role in the 1992 action blockbuster Cliffhanger with Sylvester Stallone. This led to roles in independent films with lead roles in Beyond Bedlam (1994) with Elizabeth Hurley, Galaxis (1995) with Brigitte Nielsen, Proteus, Killing Time, and Darklands.

In 1999, Fairbrass landed the regular role of Dan Sullivan in EastEnders. He left the show in August 2001. He then took the lead role of Ray Betson in the Channel Five crime drama The Great Dome Robbery.

Fairbrass returned to the U.S., starring in the Chris Klein comedy, The Long Weekend, and as Henry Caine opposite Nathan Fillion in White Noise 2. In February 2007, he appeared as the renegade Jaffa, Arkad, in the episode "Talion" in the final season of Stargate SG-1, as a guest lead in The Sarah Connor Chronicles opposite Lena Headey, and as guest lead Devon Burke, a rogue MI5 agent in David Mamet's hit show The Unit.

In 2007, he starred in the feature film Rise of the Footsoldier as real life gangster Pat Tate, and opposite Jason Statham in The Bank Job. The following year he joined Til Schweiger in the game-based action film Far Cry (2008). Fairbrass provided additional voices in the video game Call of Duty 4: Modern Warfare (2007), then again as one of the most iconic characters in the game's history as Ghost in Call of Duty: Modern Warfare 2 (2009) and as various characters in Call of Duty: Modern Warfare 3.  In 2011, Fairbrass took the co-lead in the crime thriller St Georges Day, other lead roles included Vikingdom 3D, House of the Rising Sun, opposite Dave Bautista, Hijacked, and Get Lucky and Let me Survive. In 2012, Fairbrass took his first lead role in a US action thriller The Outsider, which starred Jason Patric, James Caan and Shannon Elizabeth. In Bula Quo!, he co-starred alongside Rick Parfitt and Francis Rossi. In 2014 he took the lead in the psychological thriller, Breakdown, alongside James Cosmo, Bruce Payne, Emmett Scanlan, Olivia Grant. In 2015, he played the lead role of Jack Cregan in the revenge thriller London Heist alongsoide Steven Berkoff, which he also co-wrote. The film was produced by his own son, Luke Fairbrass. Craig Fairbrass went on to win the Best Actor Award at the 2016 Marbella International Film Festival for the role.

In 2017, Fairbrass reprised his role of Pat Tate in Rise of the Footsoldier 3: The Pat Tate Years, a prequel to the 2007 original and proved to be Fairbrass's most powerful performance to date, winning him the best actor award at the 2018 National Film Awards in London.

In 2020, Fairbrass played Eddie Franks in the critically acclaimed, London crime thriller Villain. He reprised his role of Pat Tate in the fifth installment of Rise of the Footsoldier Origins, directed by Nick Nevern.

In 2022, Fairbrass starred in Ross McCall's A Violent Man. Fairbrass' performance was praised by Leslie Felperin, writing for The Guardian, but the film itself was negatively reviewed, earning 2/5 stars.

Personal life
Fairbrass married former Page Three glamour model Elke Kellick in 1987. They have two sons together.

While he enjoys the roles in films revolving around knife crime, criminal gangs, and violence, Fairbrass stated in a 2020 interview: "I'm very wary of the violence that is in the films. It's like playing Call of Duty [...] people say to me, 'How do you feel that you're [...] voicing characters in games that could be the instigation for someone to go out and commit murder?' I am just an actor. In the end of the day, it's all make believe. Some people take it a step further."

Filmography

Film

Television

Video games

References

External links
 
 

1963 births
Living people
English male film actors
English male soap opera actors
English male voice actors
Male actors from London
People from Stepney